Esse Mbeyu Akida (born 18 November 1992) is a professional Kenyan footballer, who currently plays for PAOK in Greece, and is a member "Harambee Starlets", the Kenya National Football Team.

Club career
Akida joined Moving The Goalposts (MTG) in 2002

She was awarded top scorer for the 2016 COTIF Women Football Tournament in Valencia, Spain.

In October 2018, Akida transferred to Israeli Ligat Nashim club FC Ramat HaSharon.

In February 2020, Esse Akida joined Beşiktaş J.K. in Turkey for an undisclosed fee. After appearing in two matches of the 2019-20 Turkish Women's First Football League season's second half, which discontinued due to COVID-19 pandemic in Turkey, she left Turkey on 23 February 2021 to return to her country. She currently plays for PAOK.

International career
She played for Kenya at the 2016 Africa Women Cup of Nations, scoring for Kenya in the match against Ghana.

She scored for Kenya in a 2018 Africa Women Cup of Nations qualification match against Equatorial Guinea.

Currently also playing for the Kenya National Football team; "Harambee Starlets".

See also
List of Kenya women's international footballers

References

External links

1992 births
Living people
People from Kilifi County
Kenyan women's footballers
Women's association football forwards
F.C. Ramat HaSharon players
Beşiktaş J.K. women's football players
Ligat Nashim players
Kenya women's international footballers
Kenyan expatriate footballers
Kenyan expatriate sportspeople in Israel
Expatriate women's footballers in Israel
Kenyan expatriate sportspeople in Turkey
Expatriate women's footballers in Turkey